Verrierdale is a rural locality in the Sunshine Coast Region, Queensland, Australia.

Geography
Verrierdale is located in the Sunshine Coast hinterland, between Eumundi and the residential estate Peregian Springs.

History
Verrierdale is thought to have been named after for David George Verrier, an early settler who selected land in the area .

Verrierdale State School opened on 14 August 1916 and closed on 31 December 1963. It was at 2 Pryor Road.

References

Further reading 

  – include Verrierdale State School

Suburbs of the Sunshine Coast Region
Localities in Queensland